Herbert John Louis Hinkler  (8 December 1892 – 7 January 1933), better known as Bert Hinkler, was a pioneer Australian aviator (dubbed "Australian Lone Eagle") and inventor.  He designed and built early aircraft before being the first person to fly solo from England to Australia, completed on 22 February 1928, and the first person to fly solo across the Southern Atlantic Ocean. He married in 1932 at the age of 39, and died less than a year later after crashing into remote countryside near Arezzo, Tuscany, Italy during a solo flight record attempt.

Early life
Hinkler was born in Bundaberg, Queensland, the son of John William Hinkler, a Prussian-born stockman, and his wife Frances Atkins (née Bonney) Hinkler. In his childhood, Hinkler would observe ibis flying near a lake at his school. After gaining an understanding on the principles of flight, he constructed two gliders.

He later met Arthur Burr Stone at a travelling show in Bundaberg and again at the Brisbane Exhibition where Hinkler worked with Stone to solve a problem with the "Blériot", the world's first monoplane. In 1913, Hinkler went to England where he worked for the Sopwith Aviation Company, the beginning of his career in aviation.

World War I
During the First World War, Hinkler served with the Royal Naval Air Service as a gunner/observer in Belgium and France, for which he was awarded the Distinguished Service Medal. In 1918 Hinkler was posted to No. 28 Squadron RAF with which he served as a pilot in Italy.

Hinkler was an "exceptional mathematician and inventor" and "made a lot of aviation instruments which were in use up until the Second World War." For example, "one was a gadget to correct drift as airplanes fly a little bit on their side, not straight ahead." Furthermore, "in WWI, Hinkler invented a machine gun adaptor for air gunners. Back then, when the biplanes were flying upside down in combat, the hot, ejected shells would fall and burn the chest of the gunners as they fired. Hinkler's invention had the ejected shells all flying off to one side instead."

Later life and career

After the war, he worked as a test pilot for the aircraft manufacturer A.V. Roe in Southampton. The Australian Government offered £10,000 as a prize for the first flight to Australia; Hinkler entered, but his aeroplane crashed in Europe during a storm.

In 1921, Hinkler shipped a tiny Avro Baby to Sydney, Australia.

During the 1920s, he competed in numerous aviation events and set many records, among which was a non-stop flight from England to Latvia. For his England-Latvia flight he was awarded the Oswald Watt Gold Medal for 1927. He was a pilot of the British Schneider Trophy seaplane competitor.

Hinkler flew the first solo flight between England and Australia, departing England on 7 February 1928 and arriving in Darwin on 22 February; and back in his home town of Bundaberg a few days later on 27 February. This reduced the England-Australia record from 28 days to just under 15 days. The aircraft used was an Avro Avian with the registration G-EBOV. The flight was little noticed before Hinkler reached India but then media interest intensified. One paper nicknamed the flyer "Hustling Hinkler" and he was the subject of the Tin Pan Alley song Hustling Hinkler Up in the Sky.

For the flights in 1920 and 1928 Hinkler had already won two Britannia trophies and the gold medal of the Fédération Aéronautique Internationale. He was also awarded the 1928 Oswald Watt Gold Medal.

Hinkler is quoted as telling the Australian Prime Minister Stanley Bruce at this time: "You know, one day, people will fly by night and use the daylight for sightseeing." (In 1998 Australian Lang Kidby recreated this flight in a similar 1927 Avro Avian.) He was invited by the Speaker of the House of Representatives, Littleton Groom, to be seated on the floor of the House in recognition of his achievement. (The next time such an invitation was extended was in 1973, to Patrick White, who declined.) After visiting the principal cities of Australia and returning to England, he was awarded the Air Force Cross for the finest aerial exploit of the year.

In 1931 came his most remarkable feat. Hinkler flew in a de Havilland Puss Moth from Canada to New York then non-stop to Jamaica , then to Venezuela, Guyana, Brazil, and then across the South Atlantic to Africa; this part of the journey was done in extremely bad weather, but despite a tearing gale and practically no visibility for part of the way because of low and heavy clouds, he drifted a comparatively small distance off his course. From West Africa he flew to London. For this he was awarded the Royal Aero Club Gold Medal, the Segrave Trophy, the Johnston Memorial Prize, and the Britannia Trophy for the most meritorious flying performance of the year. He was also awarded his third and fourth Oswald Watt Gold Medals. This was the first solo flight across the South Atlantic and Hinkler was only the second person to cross the Atlantic solo, after Charles Lindbergh in 1927.

Hinkler married in 1932.

On 7 January 1933, Hinkler left London Air Park, Hanworth, England, in the Puss Moth in an attempt to break the flying record to Australia held by C. W. A. Scott of 8 days 20 hours. Nothing more was heard of him until his body was discovered in the Tuscan Mountains in Italy on 27 April 1933. The body was badly damaged but his identity was confirmed when his passport was found. It was determined his aeroplane had crashed into the mountains the same day he departed from London. He was buried – with full military honours on the orders of Italy's ruling dictator Benito Mussolini – in the Cimitero degli Allori in Florence. A monument in his memory was erected at Prato Alle Vacche in the Pratomagno mountain by the Aretino Aero Club. He was survived by both his legal wife Katherine and his de facto wife Nance.

He is remembered as being thoroughly courageous without being reckless, and was successful in his amazing feats because he was practically faultless as a pilot, and knew exactly what he and his machines could do.

Honours
The Federal electorate of Hinkler, in Queensland, is named after him.
In 1978 he was honoured on a postage stamp depicting his portrait issued by Australia Post.
Thornhill, Southampton, Hampshire, England has three places in honour of Bert Hinkler: Hinkler Road, Hinkler Pub, and Hinkler Park, which contains a monument to him erected by the residents of Thornhill. In 1983, "Mon Repos", the house in Thornhill that Bert Hinkler and his de facto wife Hannah (Nance) Jarvis built, was saved from demolition and relocated to the Bundaberg Botanic Gardens, serving as a historical museum On 8 December 2008, the A$7.5 million Hinkler Hall of Aviation was opened to the public in Hinkler's home town of Bundaberg. Adjacent to his English home "Mon Repos", the hall continues the role the house played as a historic museum dedicated to the memory of Hinkler; this has allowed the house to be refurbished to a more domestic state and now serves as a joint attraction with the Hall of Aviation.

Qantas has named an Airbus A380 after the aviator, with his name featured on the aircraft.
Hinkler Park in Bundaberg, Queensland, now hockey fields, marks the original location of Hinkler's landing in 1928 after his historic 1928 solo flight.   
The Royal Automobile Club of Queensland erected a monument atop the Sloping Hummock, an extinct volcano and one of the Bundaberg region's highest points.  
A bust of Hinkler, by sculptor George Virine, sits at the southern end of the Burnett Traffic Bridge.
Hinkler Crescent, once a taxiway for the original Darwin Aerodrome, Fannie Bay, Darwin, NT, Australia is named after Bert Hinkler and has a commemorative plaque in the pavement.
Hinkler Park, a popular park and playground in Katoomba, New South Wales, was dedicated to Hinkler in 1934. The park features a climbing frame in the shape of his aircraft and a picnic shelter featuring a commemorative plaque.
Hinkler Park, adjacent to the lagoon at the north end of Manly Beach is named in his honour, and is also the site of a building for the Australian Air League. The first training Squadron opened at Manly, New South Wales on 17 January 1935.
A cenotaph stands to Hinkler in Buss Park, Bourbong street, Central Bundaberg.
The Hinkler Hall of Aviation is an aeronautics museum in the Bundaberg Botanic Gardens dedicated to the pioneer.
Songs were written about Hinkler, including Hustling Hinkler, recorded by Len Maurice and Fred Monument, and Hello! Hinkler sung by Frederick George.
Bert Hinkler was also awarded the Oswald Watt Medal four times in 1927, 1928, 1931 and 1932.
 Nakara Primary School in Nakara, Northern Territory has a school house-team called 'Hinkler'.

Legacy 
A small piece of wood, a relic from one Hinkler's hand-made gliders, was presented to the US astronaut Don Lind in early 1986 as a token of appreciation for his coming to Bundaberg to contribute to the Hinkler Memorial Lectures.  Lind in turn gave it to Dick Scobee, the captain of the ill-fated final Space Shuttle Challenger mission.  Scobee took the wood with him on board the Challenger, inside a small plastic bag that he placed in his locker.  After the explosion, the bag and the wood were recovered from the sea, identified, mounted, and later returned to the Hinkler Memorial Museum.

State Library of Queensland holds a significant collection of letters, correspondence and items linked to Hinkler. The letters written by Hinkler to his family, (1913–1929), reveal deeply personal accounts of his adventures abroad and perspective of his achievements. Digitisations of the letters and a 1928 recording of Bert Hinkler's speech are available online.

See also
 Hinkler Ibis

References

External links

Hinkler Hall of Aviation Museum website
Bert Hinkler Commemorative Medal
Bert Hinkler online collection – State Library of NSW
Bert Hinkler collection – State Library of Queensland 
HistoryNet picture of the day 7 February 2008
Record solo flights from England to Australia 1928 to 1933
HINKLER – THE BRILLIANT NAVIGATOR An aviator whose sense of direction was uncanny, Hinkler broke many records in light aeroplanes.
 Listen to a clip from Hinkler's 'Message to Australia' and read more about the recording on australianscreen online
 Hinkler's 'Message to Australia' was added to the National Film and Sound Archive's Sounds of Australia Registry in 2010
 Read more about Hinkler and listen to songs inspired by him on the National Film and Sound Archive of Australia's website: 'Our Heroes of the Air'
Bert Hinkler’s record flight (1928), State Library of Queensland
Helvellyn Memorial to Bert Hinkler

1892 births
1933 deaths
Aviators killed in aviation accidents or incidents
Australian aviation record holders
Australian people of German descent
Royal Naval Air Service aviators
Royal Naval Air Service personnel of World War I
Royal Air Force personnel of World War I
People from Bundaberg
Recipients of the Distinguished Service Medal (United Kingdom)
Segrave Trophy recipients
Britannia Trophy winners
Victims of aviation accidents or incidents in Italy
Victims of aviation accidents or incidents in 1933
Burials in Florence
Military personnel from Queensland